Carducci is a crater on Mercury. It has a diameter of 108.19 kilometers. Its name was adopted by the International Astronomical Union (IAU) in 1976. Carducci is named for the Italian poet Giosue Carducci, who lived from 1835 to 1907.

References

Impact craters on Mercury